Saftsuppe or sago groat soup is a dessert soup made from various juices, water, and a thickening agent, usually either potato flour or cornstarch. Dried fruit such as raisins or sago groats are added as well. It is frequently served with pancakes or vanilla ice cream. It can be made from a variety of juices, such as blueberry juice, pineapple juice, and currant juice.

History 

In Scouting circles, it is known as Gasmann soup, being named after scout leader and pastor Hans Møller Gasmann.

See Also 
 List of Norwegian desserts

References 

Norwegian cuisine
Desserts